Rosewood London, formerly Chancery Court, is a luxury 5-star hotel in London, England. It is located at 252 High Holborn in the Covent Garden neighbourhood of the West End.

History

The building comprises four blocks: the central block was designed by C. Newman and built between 1912 and 1919 while the east block (including Scarfes Bar) was designed by P Moncton and built between 1929 and 1930, the south-east extension was designed by Bates & Sinning and built between 1954 and 1956 and the west block (including the Holborn Dining Room) was designed by Bates & Sinning and built between 1959 and 1960. The property was formerly the headquarters of the Pearl Assurance Company from 1914 to 1989. It is a Grade II listed building.

The hotel was opened in 2000 managed by Marriott International under its Renaissance Hotels brand as the Renaissance Chancery Court. This relationship ended on 11 June 2011. The hotel operated as the independent Chancery Court Hotel until closing in July 2013 for renovations leading to a planned reopening in October 2013 as the Rosewood London Hotel, a part of Hong Kong-based Rosewood Hotels & Resorts.

The hotel was a filming location for The Saint (1997), The Politician's Wife (1995) and the hotel's previous fine-dining restaurant, Pearl, played host to the finale of Masterchef: The Professionals (2010). The 1883 segment of the 2005 Doctor Who online adventure game, "Attack of the Graske", takes place on High Holborn in front of the address at which the hotel would later be constructed.

References

External links

Rosewood London Official Website

Hotels in London